Mardi Gras is a 1958 American musical comedy film directed by Edmund Goulding and starring Pat Boone and Christine Carère.

Plot
A military school cadet (Boone) wins a date with a French movie goddess (Carère) who happens to be the queen of the "Mardi Gras" parade. The two fall in love, but Carère's movie studio wants to capitalize on this newly found love for publicity.

Cast
Pat Boone as Paul Newell 
Christine Carère as Michelle Marton (singing voice was dubbed by Lilyan Chauvin)
Tommy Sands as Barry Denton
Sheree North as Eadie West (singing voice was dubbed by Eileen Wilson)
Gary Crosby as Tony Collins 
Fred Clark as Al Curtis 
Dick Sargent as Dick Saglon
Barrie Chase as Torchy Larue 
Jennifer West as Sylvia Simmons 
Geraldine Wall as Ann Harris
King Calder as Lt. Col. Vaupell
Robert Burton as Comdr. Tydings
 The Corps of Cadets of the Virginia Military Institute

Production
Jerry Wald announced the film in October 1957. It was called Romantic Comedy and was based on an original story by Curtis Harrington, who worked for Wald. The film was about the adventures of four students from the Virginia Military Institute at Mardi Gras, but Wald was unable to use that title because Universal had it registered and he needed permission from the city of New Orleans. Wald said the stars would be Robert Wagner, Jeffrey Hunter and Tony Randall and he hoped for Mitzi Gaynor to play the movie star.

The following month these permissions had been secured and Wald had also arranged for cooperation from the city of New Orleans and the Virginia Military Institute. Winston Miller had been signed to write a script and had already completed half the job. He was sent to VMI for further research.

Wald arranged for second unit filming done of Virginia Military Institute even before a director had been arranged. He originally wanted Gene Kelly but Kelly was too expensive. He eventually decided on Edmund Goulding, whose career was in decline and was therefore cheap, because Wald had admired his films when he was younger.

The script was finished by November 1957.

Casting
In December 1957, Wald announced Barry Coe from Peyton Place would play a lead.

Pat Boone's casting was announced in February 1958. Shirley Jones, who had co-starred with Boone in April Love, was meant to play the female lead but had to drop out due to pregnancy. Instead the studio cast French actress Christine Carere, who has just made A Certain Smile for Fox.

The film was Sheree North's final film with 20th Century Fox, who had signed North in 1954 in order to mold her as a replacement for Marilyn Monroe. While under contract with Fox, North made six other movies that Fox also released; How to Be Very, Very Popular (1955), The Lieutenant Wore Skirts (1956), The Best Things in Life Are Free (1956), The Way to the Gold (1957), No Down Payment (1957) and In Love and War (1958).

Filming started 15 July 1958.

Shot on location in New Orleans, in CinemaScope and Deluxe color, this was director Goulding's final film.

Reception
The film received generally good notices ("makes for sprightly, gay entertainment" – Los Angeles Times).

It opened at number four at the US box office and the following week went to number one where it stayed for two weeks and Variety ranked it the December box office winner but it failed to continue to do well at the box-office.

According to Kinematograph Weekly the film performed "better than average" at the British box office in 1959.

North was then released from her studio contract.  Fox seemed to have lost interest in her in 1956 when they signed Jayne Mansfield to a six-year contract.

Diabolique later wrote "The film is bright enough, but is hampered by its casting. Boone is fine, but Carrere looks like a stunned mullet for most of the running time. Boone kisses her on the cheek, incidentally, but still no mouth!"

Awards
Composer Lionel Newman was nominated for the Academy Award for Best Original Score (Scoring of a Musical Picture) for this film.

References

External links

 
 Turner Classic Movies page

1950s English-language films
1958 musical comedy films
1958 films
Films directed by Edmund Goulding
Films scored by Lionel Newman
Films set in New Orleans
20th Century Fox films
Holiday-themed films
Mardi Gras
American musical comedy films
CinemaScope films
1950s American films